The 1951–52 Romanian Hockey League season was the 22nd season of the Romanian Hockey League. Nine teams participated in the league, and Avantul Miercurea Ciuc won the championship.

Regular season

External links
hochei.net

Romania
Romanian Hockey League seasons
1951–52 in Romanian ice hockey